The 2018–19 Santos Laguna season is the 36st season in the football club's history and the 31st consecutive season in the top flight of Mexican football. In addition to the Liga MX and Copa MX, the club will also compete in the CONCACAF Champions League.

Coaching staff

Players

Squad information

Players and squad numbers last updated on 3 December 2018.Note: Flags indicate national team as has been defined under FIFA eligibility rules. Players may hold more than one non-FIFA nationality.

Transfers

In

Out

Competitions

Overview

Torneo Apertura

League table

Results summary

Result round by round

Matches

Quarter-finals

Apertura Copa MX

Group stage

Torneo Clausura

League table

Results summary

Result round by round

Matches

CONCACAF Champions League

Round of 16

Quarterfinals

Semi-finals

Statistics

Goals

Assists

Hat-tricks

Clean sheets

References

External links

Mexican football clubs 2018–19 season
Santos Laguna seasons
Santos L